The 2020 Collingwood Magpies season was the club's fourth year of senior competition in the Suncorp Super Netball league. The club would have fielded a reserves team in the Australian Netball League, though were prevented from doing so due to the COVID-19 pandemic.

The Magpies were coached by Rob Wright and co-captained for the second consecutive year by Geva Mentor and Madison Browne. The club entered the season off the back of a fourth-place finish and elimination final defeat in the 2019 season.

Player changes

Squad

Pre-season

Super Club
Magpies won the 2019 Netball New Zealand Super Club tournament. They won all five matches, concluding with a 49–42 win against Northern Mystics  in the final.  
Group B

Final ladder

Semi-finals

 
Final

Super Netball season

Ladder

Results
Notes
 Colours:   
 Home teams are listed left, away teams right.
 The season was scheduled to begin on 2 May, though was postponed to 1 August due to the COVID-19 pandemic.

Statistics

See also
 2020 Suncorp Super Netball season
 2020 Collingwood Football Club season

References

External links
 Club website

Collingwood Magpies Netball seasons
Collingwood